Islam in Guadeloupe is a minority religion in the region.

History
Islam began to spread in the region since the 1940s. In the early 1990s, the idea to construct a mosque was proposed but the plan was halted midway.

Demographics
As of 2009, there were around 2,000 Muslims in Guadeloupe, representing about 0.4% of the population.

Organizations
 Guadeloupe Muslim Association, established in 2015
 Jamaat-e-Ahmadiyya Guadeloupe, established in 2016

See also
 Demographics of Guadeloupe

References

Guadeloupe
Islam in the Caribbean
Religion in Guadeloupe